They Called Us Enemy is a 2019 graphic novel that is a collaboration by George Takei, Justin Eisinger, Steven Scott, and Harmony Becker. It is about his experiences during the internment of Japanese Americans in World War II. It is published by Top Shelf Productions.

The writing was done by Takei, Eisinger, and Scott. Becker did the illustrations, using grayscale. According to Ed Park of The New York Times, manga influenced the artwork.

According to Steve Segal of the Pittsburgh Tribune-Review, the memoirs during Takei's time as a child take up the bulk of the work, and that "harsh reality" and "minutiae of daily life" occur back and forth.

Creation and conception
The book's writing began in the beginning part of 2017, and in the same part of 2018 the writing process concluded. In the latter year, the producers of the comic hired the artist.

The writers used Allegiance and To The Stars as inspiration. The research process involved books, documents, film, and photographic works. Clip Studio Paint was used to create the artwork, and the work intended to have inspiration from American artwork and Japanese artwork.

Release
The Air Force Academy had acquired copies to give to cadets.

Reception
The book received an American Book Award in 2020.

Kirkus Reviews stated that the work is "A powerful reminder of a history" and that the images "effectively convey the intense emotions and the stark living conditions."

Park praised the "pure" "power of the story" and how the artwork is "clear, empathic"; according to Park, the shifting to the past and the present day occurs too often, and due to so many people collaborating on the work at the same time, "There are some glitches".

Michael Cavna of the Washington Post argued that the work is more similar to March than to Maus.

References

External links
 They Called Us Enemy: Expanded Edition - Penguin Random House

Videos from the official YouTube account of IDW Publishing:

American comics
2019 graphic novels
American memoirs
Books about the internment of Japanese Americans